is the 31st single by the Japanese idol girl group AKB48; it was released in Japan on May 22, 2013.

As of the release day, the CD single "Sayonara Crawl" had been shipped in 2.3 million copies, besting the group's previous record of 2.0 million from "Manatsu no Sounds Good!". , over 1.9 million copies have been sold.

On 21 March 2022, Thai version of "Sayonara Crawl" has been sung by the combination members of BNK48 and CGM48.

Release 

The single was released in the form of several different editions: 3 generally distributed editions titled Type A, Type K, and Type B and Theater Edition to be sold at the AKB48 Theater.

There are also limited editions of Types A, K, and B. All editions contained a voting card for the AKB48 2013 General Election to determine the lineup for the group's 32nd single.

The release marks the first time the group has presented a “quadruple center” lineup for the title track. The centers are: Tomomi Itano, Yuko Oshima, Haruka Shimazaki and Mayu Watanabe.

This is also the first time where Tomomi Itano performed as the center in AKB48 Single, but this time, in a Quadruple Center Format. This is the last single to feature members Sayaka Akimoto, Natsumi Matsubara, Tomomi Nakatsuka, Mika Komori, and Shiori Nakamata.

Track listing 

The first 2 songs on the CD and the first 3 music videos on the DVD are the same for all versions.

Type A

Type K

Type B

Theater Edition

Members

"Sayonara Crawl" 

Center: Mayu Watanabe, Tomomi Itano, Yuko Oshima, Haruka Shimazaki

 Team A: Anna Iriyama, Rina Kawaei, Ayaka Kikuchi, Mariko Shinoda, Minami Takahashi, Yui Yokoyama, Mayu Watanabe
 Team K: Maria Abe, Tomomi Itano, Yūko Ōshima, Rie Kitahara, Mariya Nagao
 Team B: Yuki Kashiwagi, Rena Katō, Haruna Kojima, Haruka Shimazaki, Reina Fujie
 SKE48 Team S / Team K: Jurina Matsui
 SKE48 Team S: Yuria Kizaki, Rena Matsui
 SKE48 Team E: Kanon Kimoto
 NMB48 Team N / AKB48 Team B: Miyuki Watanabe
 NMB48 Team M / AKB48 Team A: Fūko Yagura
 NMB48 Team N: Nana Yamada, Sayaka Yamamoto
 HKT48 Team H / AKB48 Team A: Haruka Kodama
 HKT48 Team H: Rino Sashihara, Sakura Miyawaki
 HKT48 Kenkyuusei: Meru Tashima, Mio Tomonaga
 JKT48 Team J / AKB48 Team B: Aki Takajō
 SNH48 / AKB48 Team K: Sae Miyazawa

"Bara no Kajitsu" 

Center: Natsuki Kojima, Nana Okada, Mako Kojima

 Team A: Karen Iwata, Ryoka Oshima, Juri Takahashi, Yuka Tano
 Team K: Tomu Muto
 Team B: Natsuki Kojima
 Kenkyuusei: Nana Okada, Mako Kojima
 SKE48 Team KII: Manatsu Mukaida
 SKE48 Team E: Nao Furuhata
 NMB48 Team N: Akari Yoshida
 NMB48 Team M: Keira Yogi
 HKT48 Team H: Natsumi Matsuoka, Madoka Moriyasu
 HKT48 Kenkyuusei: Marika Tani

"Ikiru Koto" 
Center: Minami Takahashi, Mayu Watanabe

 Team A: Anna Iriyama, Karen Iwata, Rina Izuta, Ryoka Oshima, Rina Kawaei, Ayaka Kikuchi, Marina Kobayashi, Riho Kotani, Sumire Sato, Mariko Shinoda, Juri Takahashi, Minami Takahashi, Yūka Tano, Shiori Nakamata (Last Single), Tomomi Nakatsuka (Last Single), Sakiko Matsui, Ayaka Morikawa, Yui Yokoyama, Mayu Watanabe

"How Come?" 

Center: Tomomi Itano, Yuko Oshima, Jurina Matsui

 Team K: Maria Abe, Sayaka Akimoto (Last Single), Tomomi Itano, Mayumi Uchida, Yuko Oshima, Rie Kitahara, Asuka Kuramochi, Kana Kobayashi, Amina Sato, Shihori Suzuki, Haruka Shimada, Rina Chikano, Chisato Nakata, Mariya Nagao, Nana Fujita, Ami Maeda, Jurina Matsui, Natsumi Matsubara (Last Single), Miho Miyazaki, Tomu Muto

"Romance Kenjū" 
Center: Yuki Kashiwagi, Haruka Shimazaki

 Team B: Anna Ishida, Haruka Ishida, Miori Ichikawa, Misaki Iwasa, Ayaka Umeda, Mina Ōba, Shizuka Ōya, Yuki Kashiwagi, Haruka Katayama, Rena Kato, Natsuki Kojima, Haruna Kojima, Mika Komori (Last Single), Haruka Shimazaki, Miyu Takeuchi, Miku Tanabe, Mariko Nakamura, Wakana Natori, Misato Nonaka, Reina Fujie, Suzuran Yamauchi, Miyuki Watanabe

"Hasute to Wasute" 
Center: Rina Kawaei

 Team A: Rina Kawaei, Minami Takahashi
 Team B: Yuki Kashiwagi, Haruna Kojima, Haruka Shimazaki
 AKB48 Kenkyuusei: Minami Minegishi
 HKT48 Team H: Rino Sashihara

Note: This song is the result of a special episode of Mecha-Mecha Iketeru!, in which fifteen members of AKB48 participated in a surprise end-of-term exam to determine the "Center Baka" (センターバカ; Idiot Center). The seven members who ranked in the lower half of the class were named the "Baka 7" (バカ7; Seven Idiots), with Kawaei Rina becoming the "Center Baka" for placing last and performs with a harness on, with 'Hasute' and 'Wasute'. The title of the song comes from "Hasute to wasute ga nakayoku tsukutta" (ハステとワステが仲良く作った; "Haste and Waste made friends"), which was Kawaei's answer for translating "Haste makes waste" into Japanese. The title of the song is based on one of the answers Kawaei Rina gave in her test. The question was to translate the English phrase "Haste makes waste" into Japanese. Kawaei gave the answer ハステとワステが仲良く作った (Hasute and Wasute made friendly together), believing Haste and waste to be names. Listed in parentheses are each member's test rankings.

The performing members consist of the "Baka 7", the members with the lowest scores on a test on Japanese, maths, general knowledge, science and English, taken on the 'Mechaike Bakajo Test' dokkiri special. The ranking from lowest to highest was:
Baka 7: Kawaei Rina (239), Takahashi Minami (259), Kojima Haruna (261), Shimazaki Haruka (278), Minegishi Minami (288), Sashihara Rino (293), Kashiwagi Yuki (323)

"Love Shugyō" 
Center: Mako Kojima

 AKB48 Kenkyuusei: Moe Aigasa, Saho Iwatate, Natsuki Uchiyama, Ayano Umeta, Miyū Ōmori, Ayaka Okada, Nana Okada, Saki Kitazawa, Mako Kojima, Yukari Sasaki, Ayana Shinozaki, Yurina Takashima, Miki Nishino, Hikari Hashimoto, Rina Hirata, Mitsuki Maeda, Minami Minegishi, Yuiri Murayama, Shinobu Mogi

Charts

Billboard charts

Oricon charts

G-music (Taiwan)

Year-end charts

Release history

Notes

References 

 Releases

 Other references

External links 

 Official announcement of the title - AKB48 official site

2013 singles
AKB48 songs
Songs with lyrics by Yasushi Akimoto
King Records (Japan) singles